Bert E. Rose Jr (September 26, 1919 – October 14, 2001) was a football executive.

References
UW alumni

1919 births
2001 deaths
American football executives
Minnesota Vikings executives